Playoff is a 2011 biographical film, written and directed by Israeli director, Eran Riklis. The film is inspired by the life of Ralph Klein, Israel's most famous basketball coach.

Plot
The film tells the story of legendary Israeli basketball coach Max Stoller. He became a national hero, when he made Maccabi Tel Aviv into European Champions in the late Seventies, one of Israel's first great international sporting successes. But Max became a national traitor equally fast, when he then accepted the against-all-odds job of turning the totally hopeless West-German basketball team into European winners.

Max always maintains that Germany - where he was born before the war - means nothing to him, and that training their national team is just another job on his path to NBA glory. But things aren't as simple as he refuses to speak German to the young players. The only person he seems to be able to relate to is a Turkish immigrant woman Deniz, and her cheeky teenage daughter Sema. Max just about falls in love with Deniz - and does succeed in reinventing the Germans as European champions. When he discovers what happened to his own family in the 1940s - it is not what he had expected. And he will realize that one cannot run away forever from one's own past and demons.

Cast
Danny Huston as Ralph Klein (Max Stoller)
Amira Casar as Deniz
Mark Waschke as Axel
Max Riemelt as Thomas
Hanns Zischler as Franz
Selen Savas as Sema
Smadi Wolfman as Ronit (Smadar Wolfman)
Andreas Eufinger as Ulrich
Mathias von Heydebrand as Dieter
Irm Hermann as Bertha
Yehuda Almagor as Shimi
Volker Metzker - Reporter Taxi
Verena Wüstkamp as Reporter - VIP Room
Oliver Klös - Cameraman
Steffen Müller - Reporter VIP
Peter Steitz - Border Police Man
Arne Habeck - Policeman
Michael Benthin as Chestnutseller
Thomas Lehmann - Policeman
Janine Bernstein - Woman Night Club
Momo (Peter W.) Schmitz as Clerk
Susanne Tischler - Saleswoman Watchstore
Andreas Dobberkau - Driver
Karl Jürgen Sihler - Reporter VIP

External links
 
 

2011 films
2010s biographical films
French biographical films
German biographical films
Israeli biographical films
English-language French films
English-language German films
English-language Israeli films
Films directed by Eran Riklis
Films set in West Germany
Films set in the 1980s
Basketball films
2010s English-language films
2010s French films
2010s German films